Espacio Carta Abierta or Carta Abierta (English: Open Letter Spot) is a group of Argentine intellectuals who formed in March 2008 in defense of the Cristina Fernández de Kirchner government, which was facing a conflict with the agricultural sector.

Members of Espacio Carta Abierta made their first public appearance on 13 May of the same year in the Gandhi library, in Buenos Aires, present were Horacio Verbitsky, Nicolás Casullo, Ricardo Forster and Jaime Sorín. This was where they presented their first open letter, which was signed by more than 750 intellectuals and artists.

Some of the Members are:
 Federico Andahazi, writer
 Cristina Banegas, actress
 Fernando Birri, film director
 Jorge Boccanera, poet and journalist
 Rodolfo Braceli, writer
 Sergio Caletti, journalist
 Manuel Callau, actor
 Nicolás Casullo, writer and philosopher
 Patricio Contreras, actor chileno-argentino.
 Roberto Tito Cossa, actor and theater director
 Jorge Dubatti, crítico teatral and historian
 José Pablo Feinmann, writer and philosopher
 León Ferrari, painter
 Horacio Fontova, musician and actor
 Juan Forn, writer
 Ricardo Forster, philosopher and essayist 
 María José Gabin, actress
 Jorge Gaggero, film director
 Norberto Galasso, historian
 Néstor García Canclini, anthropologist
 Juan Gelman, poet
 Octavio Getino, film director, narrador e investigador de medios de comunicación
 Julio Godio, sociologist
 Horacio González, sociologist, ex director de la Biblioteca Nacional Argentina.
 Eduardo Grüner, essayist
 Ricardo Halac, journalist and essayist
 Liliana Heker, writer, cuentista, novelista and Argentinian essayist.
 Carlos Heller, cooperativista, fundador y presidente del Banco Credicoop, diputado nacional
 Noé Jitrik, literary critic
 Eduardo Jozami, journalist, writer, activista, director del Centro Cultural de la Memoria «Haroldo Conti»
 Mauricio Kartún, dramaturgo and theater director
 Alejandro Kaufman, professor, crítico cultural and essayist
 Ernesto Laclau, political scientist and professor
 María Pía López (1969-), congresswoman
 Guillermo Mastrini (1967-), researcher and professor
 Mariana Moyano, journalist and professor
 Vicente Muleiro, journalist
 Luis Felipe Noé, artist
 José Nun, secretario de Cultura de la Nación
 Enrique Oteiza, engineer and professor
 Eduardo Tato Pavlovsky, psicoanalista, psicoterapeuta y actor
 Joan Prim, poet, musician, painter
 Adriana Puiggrós, politician and pedagogue
 Sergio Pujol, historian
 Lorenzo Quinteros, actor
 Eduardo Rinesi, philosopher and political scientist
 Guillermo Saccomanno, writer
 Federico Schuster, philosopher and professor (decano de Ciencias Sociales)
 Jaime Sorín, architect and dean of Facultad de Arquitectura
 Rodolfo Hamawi editor
Cristina Bejar psychologist
 Oscar Steimberg, semiologist and writer
 Gustavo Varela, philosopher
 Horacio Verbitsky, journalist
 Laura Yusem, theater director and professor

They self-define as nonpartisan, though they have been criticized for this assertion.

Criticism
They are accused to be an organic group that adheres politically to Cristina Fernández party, attack that relies on the fact that the group includes some State officials.

Grupo Aurora
A group of intellectuals called "Grupo Aurora" appeared in July of the next year. It was strongly critic of the government, and therefore they were an opposition organism of Carta Abierta.

Members:
 Marcos Aguinis
 Raúl Alfonsín
 Félix Luna
 Víctor Martínez
 Hipólito Solari Yrigoyen
 Daniel Sabsay
 Jorge Vanossi
 René Balestra

References

Presidency of Cristina Fernández de Kirchner
2008 establishments in Argentina
Kirchnerite propaganda
Argentine propaganda organisations